Songs from the West Coast is the twenty-sixth studio album by English musician Elton John, released worldwide on 1 October 2001.

Background
For this album, John once again collaborated with long-time lyricist Bernie Taupin, marking the first time the pair had written together in person. Patrick Leonard produced the album and played keyboards on several songs, as was the case for The Road to El Dorado soundtrack, released the year before.

Drummer Nigel Olsson returned to the Elton John Band full-time and Tata Vega makes an early appearance as a backup vocalist, joining the band later. Stevie Wonder, who previously worked with John on the songs "I Guess That's Why They Call It the Blues" and "That's What Friends Are For", played harmonica and clavinet on "Dark Diamond". Guy Babylon, Bob Birch and John Mahon, three of John's band members at the time, do not appear on this album.

It was the first non-soundtrack studio album from John to be released after PolyGram and Universal Music Group merged, consolidating distribution rights to his entire catalogue.

Rufus Wainwright sings backing vocals on the track "American Triangle", which is about Matthew Shepard, a gay college student who was brutally murdered in 1998. The album was dedicated to Shepard and Oliver Johnstone, band member Davey Johnstone's late son.

John has said that the inspiration for many of the songs on this album came from when he listened to Heartbreaker by Ryan Adams.

In an interview with Jon Wiederhorn in 2001, John revealed that the album was recorded using analogue tape, as he believes "the voice and instruments sound warmer".

In 2002, the album was repackaged as a special edition containing a bonus disc with remixes, B-sides and non-album singles from the time of its release.

Singles
"I Want Love" was the first single to be released from the album, later going on to be nominated for a Grammy Award. It reached No. 9 in the UK Singles Chart, No. 10 on the US Billboard Bubbling Under chart and No. 6 on the Adult Contemporary chart. It reached No. 9 in Canada. "This Train Don't Stop There Anymore" and "Original Sin" also became hit singles. None of the songs from this album hit the Billboard Hot 100 in the United States, which froze John's record of 31 years with at least one song in the Billboard Hot 100 (30 with at least one in the top 40).

Album cover
The restaurant shown on the album's cover is Rae's Restaurant, which is frequently used as a location for many Los Angeles-based film shoots, including 1993's True Romance and 2005's Lords of Dogtown. John's partner David Furnish and his Director of Operations Bob Halley appear on the album cover: Furnish as a cowboy at the bar and Halley as the man getting handcuffed.

Critical reception

For the most part, Songs from the West Coast was warmly received by music critics. AllMusic's Stephen Thomas Erlewine was glad that John made a record that sounds like his classic albums from the early 1970s, even though he still included some adult contemporary material. Erlewine went on to say that the record does not have all the "warmth" of his classic albums, but that it is still the best album he has made in years. Ken Tucker of Entertainment Weekly stated that the album effectively sounds like John's early recordings. He felt that Taupin's lyrics, such as "American Triangle", devalue the song, but at other times make John "liberated". Jane Stevenson, writing for Jam! CANOE, felt glad that John returned to his roots, even if he does not quite make it there. Barry Walters of Rolling Stone wrote that back-to-the-roots albums by artists rarely work, but John was able to make it work on Songs from the West Coast even if some songs, such as "American Triangle" and "The Emperor's New Clothes", miss the mark. Others, like "I Want Love", effectively manage to sound like his earlier work.

Track listing
All songs written by Elton John and Bernie Taupin.

Music videos
The music video for the song "I Want Love" was directed by Sam Taylor-Wood and features actor Robert Downey Jr. lip-synching to the song. He is the only person to appear in the video. The entire video is one long shot where the camera follows Downey from room to room of a large empty house (Greystone Mansion).

The music video for the song "This Train Don't Stop There Anymore" features Justin Timberlake portraying a young John.

The music video for the song "Original Sin" features Elizabeth Taylor and Mandy Moore. It also features John playing the father of Moore's character and the husband of Taylor's character. Moore was the centre of the video, who plays a huge Elton John fan from the 1970s who is transported by a dream (à la The Wizard of Oz) to one of his concerts, where she socialises with various celebrities of the period (Bette Midler, Sonny & Cher, Barbra Streisand, etc.) played by look-alikes. Then at the end she wakes up and John's character asks, "Who is this Elton John, anyway?" It also has more of an upbeat dance mix to the music.

Personnel 
 Elton John – lead vocals, acoustic piano, harmonium (6)
 Patrick Leonard – Hammond B3 organ (2, 4), organ (3), keyboards (4, 5, 11), Mellotron (10)
 Stevie Wonder – clavinet (2), harmonica (2)
 Billy Preston – Hammond B3 organ (7, 8, 10)
 Davey Johnstone – guitars (1, 2, 8), backing vocals (1-3, 7, 9-12), electric guitar (3, 7), acoustic guitar (9, 11), mandolin (9)
 David Channing – acoustic guitar (3), dobro (6)
 Rusty Anderson – electric guitar (4, 11), guitars (5, 6, 10), bouzouki (11)
 Bruce Gaitsch – acoustic guitar (4, 7)
 Paul Bushnell – bass (1-12), backing vocals (1-3, 7, 9-12)
 Nigel Olsson – drums (1, 3, 7-9), backing vocals (1-3, 7, 9-12)
 Matt Chamberlain – drums (2, 4-6, 10-12), percussion (6)
 Jay Bellerose – percussion (1, 3, 5, 7, 9)
 Paul Buckmaster – horn arrangements and conductor (1), string arrangements and conductor (5, 9, 11, 12)
 Rufus Wainwright – harmony vocals (4)
 Kudisan Kai – backing vocals (7, 8, 12)
 Tata Vega – backing vocals (8)
 Gary Barlow – backing vocals (12)

Production 
 Patrick Leonard – producer 
 Bill Bottrell – mixing 
 Alan Sanderson – mix assistant
 Joe Chiccarelli – recording, vocal recording, horn and string recording 
 David Channing – recording, vocal recording (Rufus Wainwright, 4)
 Brian Scheuble – recording 
 Ralph Sutton – recording (Stevie Wonder, 2)
 Jennifer Hilliard – recording assistant
 Katrina Leigh – recording assistant, production coordinator
 Jonathan Merritt – recording assistant 
 Todd Shoemaker – recording assistant 
 Alan Sanderson – horn and string recording assistant 
 Andy Green – vocal recording assistant 
 Tom Stanley – vocal recording assistant 
 Steve Jones – recording assistant (Stevie Wonder, 2)
 Darrell Thorp – recording assistant (Rufus Wainwright, 4)
 Stewart Whitmore – mastering 
 Derek Mackillop – A&R coordinator, management
 Todd Interland – A&R coordinator
 Adrian Collee – production coordinator
 Suzanne Ybarra – production coordinator 
 Peacock – design 
 Sam Taylor-Wood – photography
 Keith Bradley – management
 Frank Presland – management 
 Mixed at Cello Studios (Hollywood, CA).
 Mastered at Marcussen Mastering (Hollywood, CA).

Accolades

Grammy Awards

|-
|  style="width:35px; text-align:center;" rowspan="2"|2002 ||  Songs from the West Coast || Best Pop Vocal Album || 
|-
|"I Want Love" ||rowspan=2| Best Pop Vocal Performance – Male || 
|-
| style="text-align:center;"|2003 || "Original Sin" || 
|-

Charts and certifications

Weekly charts

Year-end charts

Certifications and sales

References

External links

Elton John albums
2001 albums
Albums arranged by Paul Buckmaster
Albums produced by Patrick Leonard
The Rocket Record Company albums